As Long as You Live is a 1955 West German war film directed by Harald Reinl and starring Adrian Hoven, Marianne Koch and Karin Dor. It was made at the Wiesbaden Studios and on location in Seville, Granada and the Sierra Nevada. It is set during the Spanish Civil War, which is seen from a pro-Nationalist viewpoint.

Cast

References

Bibliography

External links 
 

1955 films
1955 war films
West German films
German war films
1950s German-language films
Films directed by Harald Reinl
Films set in the 1930s
Spanish Civil War films
German black-and-white films
1950s German films
Films shot in Spain
Films set in Spain